Karol Korím (born August 20, 1993) is a Slovak professional ice hockey defenceman. He currently plays for HC Topoľčany of the Slovak 1. Liga.

Korím made his Czech Extraliga debut playing with HC Pardubice during the 2013–14 Czech Extraliga season.

Career statistics

Regular season and playoffs

International

References

External links
 

1993 births
Living people
BK Havlíčkův Brod players
AZ Havířov players
Stadion Hradec Králové players
HC Dukla Jihlava players
MHk 32 Liptovský Mikuláš players
HK Nitra players
HC Dynamo Pardubice players
LHK Jestřábi Prostějov players
Slovak ice hockey defencemen
Sportspeople from Nitra
HC 07 Detva players
Slovak expatriate ice hockey players in the Czech Republic